Laddia is a genus of submarine cave snails, marine gastropod mollusks in the family Neritiliidae.

Species
Species within the genus Laddia include:
 Laddia lamellata Kano & Kase, 2008
 Laddia traceyi (Ladd, 1965)

References

External links
 Kano, Y.; Kase, T. (2008). Diversity and distributions of the submarine-cave Neritiliidae in the Indo-Pacific (Gastropoda: Neritimorpha). Organisms, Diversity & Evolution. 8: 22-43

Neritiliidae